Pliny Lee Allen (November 27, 1873 – August 6, 1967) was an American politician in the state of Washington. He served in the Washington House of Representatives and Washington State Senate. From 1913 to 1915, he was president pro tempore of the Senate.

References

1873 births
1967 deaths
Republican Party members of the Washington House of Representatives
Republican Party Washington (state) state senators